Fairvilla is a chain of adult retail stores based in Orlando, Florida. It is owned by Bill Murphy and Shari Murphy.

Background 
Fairvilla opened its first location, called Fairvilla Twin Cinema, in 1971 in Orlando, Florida. Initially, it opened as a general theater, but, following the release of Deep Throat in 1972, it began showing adult soft-core features.

In 1991, Fairvilla Twin Cinema became Fairvilla Adult Video. The store added gifts, toys and lingerie and changed its name to reflect its expanded offerings, becoming Fairvilla Megastore in 1993. Fairvilla opened four additional locations in Florida.

In 2002, when opening the third store, owner Bill Murphy filed a lawsuit against the city of Key West, because they refused to grant the store an adult business license. The store also met with some controversy when it opened its fourth store on the tourist-laden street International Drive in 2012.

References

External links 
 http://www.floridatoday.com/story/money/business/2015/02/13/fifty-shades-increasing-sales-brevards-fairvilla/23379513/
 http://www.alternet.org/story/141586/the_joy_of_sex_toys%3A_how_vibrators_stopped_being_'shameful'_secrets
 http://www.theledger.com/article/20090205/NEWS/902050369
 http://issuu.com/watermarkmedia/docs/1704-sex
 http://weblog.globaladultmedia.com/2007/04/porn-and-adult-toy-stores-extreme-makeovers-for-the-future-of-adult-retail/
 http://articles.orlandosentinel.com/1997-08-01/news/9707310968_1_pugh-orlando-store-specializes
 http://www.hypeorlando.com/living-a-sex-positive-life/2014/05/01/what-is-fairvilla-university/

Sex shops
Pornography in Florida
Companies based in Orlando, Florida
1971 establishments in Florida
Retail companies established in 1971